A drink carrier, sometimes also known as a cup carrier, beverage carrier or cup holder is a device used to carry multiple filled beverage cups at the same time. 

There are many different designs for drink carriers, but they commonly include relatively deep indentations, holes, or compartments into which the cups are placed. This keeps the drinks from falling over during transport, and distinguishes drink carriers from cafeteria trays, though both may be used to carry both drinks and food.

Drink carriers may be made from paperboard, molded pulp, plastic or other materials.

See also
 Cup holder
 Coffee cup sleeve
 Juicebox (container)
Multi-pack of beverage packaging
Disposable food packaging

External links
 CarryAround Drink carrier patent
 Drink carrier patent

Serving and dining